Nationality words link to articles with information on the nation's poetry or literature (for instance, Irish or France).

Events
Sir Philip Sidney is knighted
William Shakespeare's first daughter Susanna is born

Works published

France
 Jean de Sponde, a Latin translation of Homer, with commentaries
 Philippe Desportes, Dernièrs Amours, which increased the author's fame; France
 Catherine Des Roches, also known as "Catherine Fradonnet", and her mother, Madeleine Des Roches, France:
 La Puce de Madame Des Roches (collection of verse)
 Secondes Oeuvres, Poitiers: Nicolas Courtoys

Great Britain
 Robert Greene, Mamillia (Part 2 published in 1593 Mamillia: The triumph of Pallas
 William Hunnis, Seven Sobs of a Sorrowful Soul
 Richard Robinson, The Auncient Order, Societie, and Unitie Laudable, of Prince Arthure, and his Knightly Armory of the Round Table, translated from the French of La devise des armes des Chevaliers de la Table Ronde, a treatise on heraldry published in Paris in 1546; adapted by the author to advertise a popular society of archers, Prince Arthur and the London Round Table; Edmund Spenser's schoolmaster, Richard Mulcaster, was a member

Births
 March 3 – Edward Herbert (died 1648), Anglo-Welsh soldier, diplomat, historian, poet and religious philosopher
 November 24 – Juan Martínez de Jáuregui y Aguilar (died 1641), Spanish poet, scholar and painter
 Robert Aylett (died 1655), English lawyer and religious poet
 William Basse (died 1653/1654), English
 John Beaumont (died 1627), poet
 Hugo Grotius (died 1645), Dutch jurist, philosopher, theologian, Christian apologist, playwright, and poet
 Ishikawa Jozan 石川丈山 (died 1672), Japanese poet and intellectual
 Francisco de Rioja (died 1659), Spanish
 Aurelian Townshend born about this year (died c. 1643), English poet and playwright

Deaths
 January 1 – François de Belleforest (born 1530), French poet and translator
 date unknown – Alexander Arbuthnot (born 1538), Scottish poet
 date unknown – Pey de Garros (born 1525), French

See also

 Poetry
 16th century in poetry
 16th century in literature
 Dutch Renaissance and Golden Age literature
 Elizabethan literature
 French Renaissance literature
 Renaissance literature
 Spanish Renaissance literature
 University Wits

Notes

16th-century poetry
Poetry